Fei Xiaotong or Fei Hsiao-tung (November 2, 1910 – April 24, 2005) was a Chinese anthropologist and sociologist. He was a pioneering researcher and professor of sociology and anthropology; he was also noted for his studies in the study of China's ethnic groups as well as a social activist. Starting in the late 1930s, he and his colleagues established Chinese sociology and his works were instrumental in laying a foundation for the development of sociological and anthropological studies in China, as well as in introducing social and cultural phenomena of China to the international community. His last post before his death in 2005 was as Professor of Sociology at Peking University.

Early years
Fei Xiaotong was born in Wujiang County of Jiangsu province in China on November 2, 1910.  His world was one plagued with political corruption and abject poverty.  He grew up in a gentry but yet not wealthy family.  His father, Fei Pu'an was educated in the Chinese classics, earned a shengyuan civil service degree, studied in Japan, and founded a middle school.  Fei's mother, Yang Renlan, the Christian daughter of a government official and also highly educated for her time, established a nursery school in Wujiang which Fei attended. Her brothers include Chinese politician Yang Qianli (father of Hong Kong director and lyricwriter Evan Yang), Architect Yang Xiliu (S. J. Young), Chinese-American animator Cy Young, and entrepreneur Yang Xiren.

Career in academic sociology

At missionary-founded Yenching University in Peiping, which had China's best sociology program, he was stimulated by the semester visit of Robert E. Park, the University of Chicago sociologist.  For an M.A. in anthropology, Fei went to nearby Tsinghua University where he studied with Pan Guangdan and learned fieldwork methods from a White Russian, S. M. Shirokogoroff.  Fei's first fieldwork experience, in the rugged mountains of Guangxi province in the far south, ended tragically after Fei's leg was crushed by a tiger trap, and his young bride Wang Tonghui died seeking help.

"Functional" anthropology
From 1936 to 1938 Fei studied at the London School of Economics under the pioneer anthropologist Bronisław Malinowski.  "From Malinowski and A.R. Radcliffe-Brown, Fei learned to focus on the functional interrelationships of various "parts" of a community and on the meaning of a culture as seen by its members. He devised survey methods which incorporated the functional approach ... "  Fei wrote his 1938 PhD thesis, based on earlier fieldwork in Kaixiangong (Chinese:) village, China and published it as Peasant Life in China (1939).

Among Fei Xiaotong's contributions to anthropology is the concept that Chinese social relations work through social networks of personal relations with the self at the center and decreasing closeness as one moves out. Among the criticisms of Fei Xiaotong's work is that his work tended to ignore regional and historical variations in Chinese behavior. Nonetheless, as a pioneer and educator, his intent was to highlight general trends, thus this simplification may have had significant justification for Fei's intent, even if they contributed to a bias in studies of Chinese society and culture.

An important work of the period, China's Gentry, was compiled from Fei's field interviews, and was published in the United States in 1953. It went on to become a staple of American university courses on China. The compilation and U.S. publication of China's Gentry grew out of a relationship Fei developed at Tsinghua University with the University of Chicago anthropologist Robert Redfield and his wife, Margaret Park Redfield.

Leading intellectual in People's Republic of China

1950s and 1960s: Politics in command
After the establishment of the People's Republic of China in 1949, Fei played an important role in national intellectual and ideological life, and before long he began to hold a growing number of political positions.  He was made vice president in 1951 of the Central Institute for Nationalities in Beijing (today, Minzu University of China), and in 1954 attended the First National People's Congress as a member of the Nationalities Affairs Commission.

Soon thereafter, however, departments of sociology were eliminated (as a "bourgeois pseudo-science"). Fei no longer taught, and published less and less.  During the “Hundred Flowers” thaw of 1956–57, he began to speak out again, cautiously suggesting the restoration of sociology.  But then the climate suddenly changed with the “Anti-Rightist Movement.”  In 1957, Fei stood with head bowed before countless assemblies to confess his “crimes toward the people.”  Hundreds of articles attacked him, not a few by colleagues, some viciously dishonest.  Fei became an outcast, humiliated, isolated, unable to teach, do research, or publish.  Twenty-three years of his life, he would later write, years that should have been his most productive period, were simply lost, wasted.  At the height of the Cultural Revolution, physically attacked by Red Guards, forced to clean toilets, he contemplated suicide.

1970s and 1980s: A 'second life'
In the 1970s, Fei, internationally known, began to receive foreign visitors, and after Mao's death he was asked to direct the restoration of Chinese sociology.  He visited the United States again and was subsequently able to arrange the visits to China of American social scientists to help with the gigantic task of training a whole new cadre of Chinese sociologists.  In 1980 he was formally rehabilitated, and was one of the judges in the long, televised trial of the Gang of Four and others held responsible for the crimes of the Cultural Revolution.

His 'second life' was more than ever that of the public intellectual, with important political posts and contact with policy makers.  His influence is thought to have been important in convincing the government to promote rural industry, whose rapid growth in the 1980s raised the income of hundreds of millions of villagers all over China. Virtually every week in the 1990s his name was in the newspapers and his face on television.  He traveled all over China, went abroad, to the US, Canada, Europe, Japan, Australia, and elsewhere, and was showered with international honors: the Malinowski Award of the Society for Applied Anthropology, the Huxley Memorial Medal of the Royal Anthropological Institute, an honorary doctorate from the University of Hong Kong, and other honors in Japan, the Philippines, Canada.  He played a role in promoting and directing the reestablishment of sociology and anthropology in China, training scholars and developing teaching materials after thirty years of prohibition.

Fei is also known for his influential theory on ethnic groups in Chinese history, which follows the tradition of Lewis H. Morgan's stage-developmental evolutionism. A representative example of his work is Fei's 1988 Tanner lecture in Hong Kong, "Plurality and Unity in the Configuration of the Chinese Nationality." According to Fei, the Huaxia became a true ethnic group, the Han, during the Qin Dynasty. Afterwards, the Han became "a nucleus with centripetal force" with their stable agricultural society attracting and assimilating ethnic nomads from China's northern frontier such as the Qiang.

The 1990s and 2000s: reminiscence and caution
Above all, it was as a writer that Fei flourished in his 'second life'. Virtually all of his old books were republished during these years, and he turned out new books and articles in even greater quantity. Of the fifteen volumes of his “Works” (1999–2001), new writings from the 1980s and 1990s fill over half. Many of the themes were familiar. He repeatedly and forcefully set forth the case for sociology and anthropology in China if modernization were to succeed. He reminisced about his village fieldwork, his studies, and his teachers. There were articles and books on rural industrialization, small towns, national minorities, and developing frontier areas. He championed the cause of intellectuals. He recounted what he had learned from his trips abroad and made some new translations from English.  There was even a little book of his poetry. What is different in all this new writing is political caution; Fei had too much to do and too little time in the last decades to risk playing with fire again.

He was Professor of Sociology at Peking University at the time of his death on April 24, 2005, in Beijing at the age of 94. A memorial has been set up in the Department of Sociology at the university, where he has taught and directed since the 1980s.

Career landmarks

Major works
 Peasant Life in China: A Field Study of Country Life in the Yangtze Valley.  Preface by Bronislaw Malinowski.  London: G. Routledge and New York: Dutton, 1939, and various reprints and a Japanese translation.
 Fei and Chang Chih-I [Zhang Zhiyi 张之毅], Earthbound China: A Study of Rural Economy in Yunnan. University of Chicago Press, 1945.
 China's Gentry: Essays in Rural-Urban Relations. Chicago: University of Chicago Press, 1953.
 Neidi de nongcun 《內地的農村》(Villages of the interior).  Shanghai: Shenghuo, 1946.
 Shengyu zhidu 《生育制度》 (The institutions for reproduction).  Shanghai: Shangwu, 1947.
 From the Soil (Xiangtu Zhongguo, 《鄉土中國》).  Shanghai: Guancha, 1948.  (Translated as From the Soil: The Foundations of Chinese Society, U. of California Press, 1992)
 Xiangtu chongjian 《鄉土重建》 (Rural recovery).  Shanghai: Guancha, 1948.
 Fei Xiaotong et al. Small Towns in China: Functions, Problems & Prospects. Beijing: New World Press, 1986.
 Xingxing chong xingxing 《行行重行行》 (Travel, travel, and more travel).  Ningxia Renmin Chubanshe, 1992.
 Fei Xiaotong wenji 《费孝通文集》 (Collected works of Fei Xiaotong), 15 vols.  Beijing: Qunyan chubanshe, 1999.

Awards
 1980:  Bronislaw Malinowski Award of the International Applied Anthropology Association
 1981:  Huxley Memorial Medal of the Royal Anthropological Institute of Great Britain and Ireland
 1988: Encyclopædia Britannica Prize in New York
 1993:  USA and Asian Cultural Prize in Fukuoka, Japan
 Doctor of Letters degree, honoris causa by the University of Hong Kong
 Doctor of Social Science degree, honoris causa, University of Macau
 1994:  Ramon Magsaysay Award for Community Leadership in the Philippines.

Political positions
Fei also made significant contributions to the study and management of the development of China's rural economy.

Before his death, Fei held a number of political positions, although these are mostly honorary; he was considered by many to be "active politically".

 Vice-president of the 6th Chinese People's Political Consultative Conference
 Vice-chairman of the 7th and 8th Standing Committee of the National People's Congress
 Vice-chairman of the Drafting Committee for the Basic Law of the Hong Kong Special Administrative Region of the People's Republic of China
 Honorary Chairman of the Central Committee of the China Democratic League, a minor party which is part of the United Front led by the Communist Party of China
Deputy Director of the Experts Bureau of the State Council
Deputy Director of the National Ethnic Affairs Committee
Chairman of the Central Committee of the Democratic Union

See also
 List of sociologists
 List of Chinese sociologists and anthropologists
 Francis L. K. Hsu

References

Further reading
  
 
 Pasternak, Burton, "A Conversation with Fei Xiaotong," Current Anthropology 29:637-62 (1988).
 "Fei Xiaotong [Hsiao-tung Fei]," American Anthropologist, 108.2:452–461 (2006).

External links
Wolfgang Saxon, "Fei Xiaotong" New York Times obituary, 9 May 2005 (registration required)]
 ]
 "Biographical information" at China Vitae.
 Obituary Xinhua (26 April 2005).

1910 births
2005 deaths
20th-century anthropologists
20th-century non-fiction writers
Chairpersons of the China Democratic League
Chinese anthropologists
Chinese non-fiction writers
Chinese sociologists
Alumni of the University of London
Educators from Suzhou
Hong Kong Basic Law Drafting Committee members
Minzu University of China alumni
Academic staff of Minzu University of China
Academic staff of the National Southwestern Associated University
Academic staff of Peking University
People's Republic of China politicians from Jiangsu
People's Republic of China writers
Politicians from Suzhou
Republic of China writers
Scientists from Suzhou
Tsinghua University alumni
Academic staff of Tsinghua University
Vice Chairpersons of the National People's Congress
Vice Chairpersons of the National Committee of the Chinese People's Political Consultative Conference
Victims of the Anti-Rightist Campaign
Writers from Suzhou
Yenching University alumni
Academic staff of Yunnan University